John Watson Lawrence (August 19, 1800 – December 20, 1888) was an American banker and politician who served one term as a U.S. Representative from New York from 1845 to 1847.

Biography 
Born in Flushing, New York, on August 19, 1800, Lawrence attended the local schools. He engaged as a mercantile clerk. He served as president of the village of Flushing 1835–1845. He was a member of the New York State Assembly (Queens Co.) in 1841 and 1842. He was extensively interested in banking.

Congress 
Lawrence was elected as a Democrat to the Twenty-ninth Congress (March 4, 1845 – March 3, 1847). He resumed banking pursuits.

He was also a trustee of the village of Flushing from 1860 on 1875.

Family 
He married Mary King Bowne, daughter of Walter Bowne and had 10 children.

Death 
He died in Flushing, New York on December 20, 1888. He was interred in Flushing Cemetery.

References

Sources

1800 births
1888 deaths
People from Flushing, Queens
Democratic Party members of the New York State Assembly
Mayors of places in New York (state)
Democratic Party members of the United States House of Representatives from New York (state)
Burials in New York (state)
Businesspeople from Queens, New York
19th-century American politicians
19th-century American businesspeople